Taegisan  is a mountain in the counties of Hoengseong and Pyeongchang, Gangwon-do in South Korea.

See also
 List of mountains in Korea

Notes

References
 

Pyeongchang County
Hoengseong County
Mountains of South Korea
Mountains of Gangwon Province, South Korea